Marie-Étienne Nitot (2 April 1750 in Paris – 9 September 1809) was a French jeweller, the official jeweller to the Emperor Napoleon, and the founder of the House of Chaumet.

History 

Nitot's family was from Château-Thierry, he himself was born in Paris on 2 April 1750. After being an apprentice to Aubert, court jeweller to Queen Marie-Antoinette, he moved to Paris in 1780.

He survived the French Revolution and, in 1802, was appointed jeweller to Emperor Napoleon. With the help of his son François Regnault (1779–1853), Nitot created jewellery symbolizing the power that Napoleon wished to convey.  These include the wedding jewels of Josephine de Beauharnais and Marie Louise of Austria. Nitot also designed Napoleon's coronation crown, his ceremonial sword and many other court ornaments.

Marie-Étienne Nitot also played an active role with his son into re-assembling the Crown Treasury (Trésor de la Couronne) dismantled and spread apart during and after the French revolution, and were exclusive providers of precious stones to Napoleon.

Marie-Étienne Nitot died in 1809. Napoleon appointed his son François Regnault Nitot to succeed him. François Regnault Nitot operated until the fall of the empire in 1815. Nitot then sold his business to his foreman, Jean-Baptiste Fossin (1786-1848).

Work 

As official jeweller to Napoleon, Nitot made a number of significant pieces. He designed the Napoleon Tiara and the Imperial Sword. He also designed the Cameo Tiara for Joséphine before 1810, but no portraits of Joséphine wearing the Cameo exists (only one portrait of her daughter Hortense wearing the Cameo and dating from 1812 exists). Marie-Étienne Nitot actually designed Joséphine's entire Emerald Parure that belongs today to the Royal family of Norway.

The Leuchtenberg sapphire parure, now part of the Swedish royal family jewel foundation, is attributed to Nitot. The sapphires are thought to have been a wedding gift from Napoleon to his step-daughter Princess Augusta of Bavaria, Duchess of Leuchtenberg and then passed to the Swedish royal family with Queen Josephine.

Gallery

References 

1750 births
1809 deaths
French jewellers
18th-century French businesspeople
19th-century French businesspeople
Material culture of royal courts